Anoop Pradhan is an Indian politician and member of the Bharatiya Janata Party. He is a member of the Uttar Pradesh Legislative Assembly from the Khair constituency in Aligarh district.

References 

Living people
1981 births
Uttar Pradesh MLAs 2017–2022
Uttar Pradesh MLAs 2022–2027
People from Aligarh district
Bharatiya Janata Party politicians from Uttar Pradesh